Zsolt Németh (born 19 July 1963) is a Hungarian fencer. He competed in the team foil event at the 1992 Summer Olympics.

References

External links
 

1963 births
Living people
Hungarian male foil fencers
Olympic fencers of Hungary
Fencers at the 1992 Summer Olympics
Fencers from Budapest